Jabez Williams Huntington (November 8, 1788November 1, 1847) was a United States representative and Senator from Connecticut.

Biography
Born in Norwich, son of Zachariah Huntington and Hannah Mumford Huntington, Huntington pursued classical studies. He graduated from Yale College in 1806. Jabez taught in the Litchfield South Farms Academy for one year, and studied law at the Litchfield Law School during 1808. He was admitted to the bar in 1810 and commenced practice in Litchfield. He married Sally Ann Huntington, the youngest daughter of his first cousin Joseph Huntington, on May 22, 1833. They did not have any children.

Career
Huntington was a member of the Connecticut House of Representatives from Litchfield in 1828. Elected to the U.S. House of Representatives in the Twenty-first, Twenty-second, and Twenty-third U.S. Congresses, He served from March 4, 1829, to August 16, 1834, when he resigned and moved to Norwich to accept the appointment of judge of the Connecticut Supreme Court of Errors. He held that office from 1834 to 1840.

In 1840 Huntington was elected as a Whig to the U.S. Senate to fill the vacancy caused by the death of Thaddeus Betts. He was reelected, and served from May 4, 1840 until his death.  During the Twenty-seventh and Twenty-eight Congresses, he was chairman of the Committee on Commerce.

Death
Huntington died in Norwich on November 1, 1847, a week shy of his 59th birthday. He is interred at the Old Norwich Town Cemetery.

See also
List of United States Congress members who died in office (1790–1899)

References

External links

  Information on relatives.

United States senators from Connecticut
Members of the Connecticut House of Representatives
Members of the United States House of Representatives from Connecticut
Connecticut lawyers
1788 births
1847 deaths
Yale College alumni
Connecticut Whigs
Whig Party United States senators
19th-century American politicians
Justices of the Connecticut Supreme Court
19th-century American judges
19th-century American lawyers